Krishna Beuraa is an Indian playback singer who has sung songs in commercial Hindi and multi language Indian regional cinemas and albums. Mostly known for his hit songs "Maula Mere" from the film Chak De India, "Main Jahan Rahoon" from the film Namaste London, "Rabba" (Musafir) and "Soniyo from the Heart" (Raaz-2). He can sing in 22 languages including his mother tongue Odia.

Early life
Krishna Beuraa is originally from Kusupangi, Banki, Cuttack, presently residing in Mumbai. His father Indramani Beura was an employee of Indian Air Force who traveled to different parts of the country. He spent about 11 years in Chandigarh, graduated from GGDSD College, Sector 32, Chandigarh and post graduation from Department of Indian Theatre (Panjab University Chandigarh). His mother Shushama Beura wanted him to be a pilot or an engineer or a doctor.

Career
Krishna Beuraa got his first break when he approached Sanjay Dutt. Sanjay not only liked his singing style but also gave him a chance to sing in four films: Rudraksh (song: "Ishq Khudai"), Rakht (song: "Sach Hai Sach Hai Yeh"), Musafir (song: "Rabba"), Deewaar (song: "Ali Ali")

From then on his journey as a singer began in Bollywood. Since then he has sung various hit songs including "Inteqam" from Shaadi Mein Zaroor Aana (2017), "Chaska" from Badmaash Company (2010), "Soniyo" (From the Heart) from Raaz - The Mystery Continues (2009).

In 2008 he also released his first solo pop album Ishq Gali Na Jaiyo composed of eight songs.

In 2010, Popular Indian rock band Bandish collaborated with him for their second self-titled album.

Style 
Krishna Beuraa is known for his very special (often uncommon) style which is very near to legend Ustad Nusrat Fateh Ali Khan. Krishna also accepts that he has a tend towards Khan sahibs grand Sufi style. Krishna is famous among his fans for his mastery on high notes (tar -saptak) in singing and harkats as well as alaaps.

Discography

Albums
Ishq Gali Na Jaiyo (Label:TIPS)
Neela Nayanaa (Label:Darubrahma Production)
Tama Kathaa Mane Pade (Label:Sun Music)
Babosa (Rajasthani Traditional Folk) (Label:KBtunes Music & Entertainment, Movement Creations LLP)
Ishqiyaat Hindi Album (Label:FNP Media LLP) (Music Distributor:Movement Creations LLP)
Aarati Hanuman Lala Ki (Producer:Praveer Singh) (Music Distributor:Movement Creations LLP)

Hindi songs

Lollywood

Regional films

Awards and nominations

References

External links

Living people
Indian male playback singers
Bollywood playback singers
Year of birth missing (living people)
Kannada playback singers
Odia playback singers